The African Union's Economic, Social and Cultural Council's Political Affairs Committee concern themselves with:

 Human rights
 Rule of law
 Democratic constitutional rule
 Good governance
 Power sharing
 Electoral institutions
 Humanitarian affairs and assistance

The Chairpersomn of the Committee is Landing Badji.

Sectoral Cluster Committees of the Economic, Social and Cultural Council